AYI may refer to:

 Ambridge Youth Ignite, an incubated ministry of Rock the World Youth Mission Alliance
 Aster Yellows Index, an index used to determine when to apply chemical controls in order to control the spread of aster yellows phytoplasma
 AYI (company), an American electronics company

See also

 Ayi (disambiguation)